Albert Leidmann (23 February 1908 – 1 February 1945) was a German boxer who competed in the 1928 Summer Olympics. He was born in Munich. In 1928 he was eliminated in the second round of the middleweight class after losing his fight to the upcoming bronze medalist Léonard Steyaert.

He was killed in action during World War II.

References

External links
Albert Leidmann's profile at Sports Reference.com

1908 births
1945 deaths
Sportspeople from Munich
Middleweight boxers
Olympic boxers of Germany
Boxers at the 1928 Summer Olympics
German male boxers
German military personnel killed in World War II
Missing in action of World War II